|}

The Rous Stakes is a Listed flat horse race in Great Britain open to horses aged three years or older. It is run at Ascot over a distance of 5 furlongs (1,006 metres), and it is scheduled to take place each year in October.

Prior to 2011 the race was run at Newmarket Racecourse.

Winners since 1988

See also
 Horse racing in Great Britain
 List of British flat horse races

References 

 Paris-Turf: 
Racing Post: 

Flat races in Great Britain
Ascot Racecourse
Open sprint category horse races